Guido Marchi (born 21 September 1896) was an Italian professional footballer who played as a right back for Juventus. His older brother Pio was also a professional footballer.

References

1896 births
Year of death missing
Italian footballers
Juventus F.C. players
Association football fullbacks